The 2018 Copa Venezuela was the 49th edition of the competition. It began with the first stage on 11 July 2018 and concluded with the second leg of the final on 31 October 2018. Primera División side Mineros were the defending champions, but they were disqualified from the competition in the second stage. 

Zulia were the champions after beating Aragua 3–1 on aggregate in the final, and qualified to the 2019 Copa Sudamericana.

First stage
Teams entering this round: 21 teams from the Segunda División.
The matches took place from 11 to 18 July 2018.

Group 1

Group 2

Group 3

Group 4

Group 5

Group 6

Group 7

Second stage

 Teams entering this round: 18 teams from the Primera División.
 The first legs were played on 8 and 9 August and the second legs were played from 14 to 16 August 2018.

|-
!colspan=5|Centro-Oriental Group

!colspan=5|Centro-Occidental Group

|}

Notes

First leg

Second leg

Final stages

Round of 16

 The first legs were played on 29 August and the second legs were played on 5 September 2018.

|-
!colspan=5|Centro-Oriental Group

!colspan=5|Centro-Occidental Group

|}

First leg

Second leg

Quarter-finals
 The first legs were played on 9 September and the second legs were played on 3 October 2018.

|-
!colspan=5|Centro-Oriental Group

|-
!colspan=5|Centro-Occidental Group

|}

First leg

Second leg

Semi-finals
 The first legs were played on 10 October and the second legs were played on 14 October 2018.

|-

|}

First leg

Second leg

Final

Zulia won 3–1 on aggregate.

References

External links
Official website of the Venezuelan Football Federation 
Copa Venezuela 2018, Soccerway.com

Copa Venezuela
Venezuela
2018 in Venezuelan football